Marczyński (feminine Marczyńska) is a Polish surname. Notable people with the surname include:

Adam Marczyński (1908–1985), Polish painter
Tomasz Marczyński (born 1984), Polish cyclist

Polish-language surnames